is a Japanese voice actor and narrator currently affiliated with Aoni Production.

Filmography

Anime
1992
 Crayon Shin-chan as Yuji

1994
 Aoki Densetsu Shoot! as Tooru Endo
 Slam Dunk as Miura
 Dragon Ball Z as Citizen (ep 243), Reporter (ep 231)
 Sailor Moon S as Boy B (ep 105), Chin-Chin Tei (ep 107)
 Marmalade Boy as Alex

1995
 Sailor Moon SuperS as Editor 2 (ep 134)

1996
 Jigoku Sensei Nube as Kimu Takera "Kimutake", Narumi
 Dragon Ball GT as Oob, Ax (ep 25), Man in Store B (ep 3)
 Sailor Moon Sailor Stars as Host (ep 191), Newscaster (ep 169), Resident (ep 183)
 Brave Command Dagwon as Ryuu Hashiba

1998
 His and Her Circumstances as Hideaki Asaba
 Kocchi Muite Miko as Kenta
 Nazca as Kendo Judge
 All Purpose Cultural Cat Girl Nuku Nuku as Rintarou Shimazaki
 Yu-Gi-Oh! as Hirata (ep 17), Male Student (ep 10)

1999
 Pokémon as Isao (ep 87)

2000
 NieA_7 as George
 Mushrambo as Volt

2001
 Offside as Hideki Yakumaru
 Kirby: Right Back at Ya! as Meta Knight, Turbo (ep 90), Chief Borun, Boney (ep 89)
 Mahoromatic - Automatic Maiden as Kiyomi Kawahara, Punk A (ep 9)
 Project ARMS: The 2nd Chapter  as Keith Green
2002
 Kanon as Yuichi Aizawa
 Princess Tutu as Pualo (ep 6)
 Mahoromatic: Something More Beautiful as Kiyomi Kawahara

2003
 Tenshi na Konamaiki as Aota
 Planetes as Corin
 Bobobo-bo Bo-bobo as Kazutaka (ep 3), Mysterious Person (ep 16)
 Mermaid Melody: Pichi Pichi Pitch as Yuya Ishibashi (ep 10)

2004
 This Ugly Yet Beautiful World as Shinichi Asakura
 Detective Conan as Yasuo Fujino (ep 368)

2005
 Gakuen Alice as Shuichi Sakurano
 Sukisho as Gaku Ichikawa

2006
 Guardian Ninja Mamoru as Mamoru Kagemori
 Code Geass: Lelouch of the Rebellion as Nagata (ep 1), Shougo Asahina, Terrorist (ep 2)
 The Story of Saiunkoku as Hakumei Heki

2007
 Big Windup! as Yoshirou Hamada
 Gintama as Kyoushirou (ep 55)
 Gegege no Kitarō as Ganbari-Nyuudou
 Koi Suru Tenshi Angelique: Kagayaki no Ashita as Timka
 D.Gray-man as Robert (eps 29-30)
 Detective Conan as Man (ep 474)
 Megaman Star Force as Gemini
 One Piece as Debt Collector (ep 318)

2008
 Gegege no Kitarō as Hidemaru
 Code Geass: Lelouch of the Rebellion R2 as Luciano Bradley, Shougo Asahina

2009
 Mahoromatic: I'm Home! as Kiyomi Kawahara

2011
 Gintama' as Kyoushirou
 Ring ni Kakero 1: Sekai Taikai-hen as Icarus (ep 5)

2012
 The Knight in the Area as Koichi Hibino

2013
 Saint Seiya Omega as Cyllène

2014
 The World Is Still Beautiful as Ocean Kingdom's Ambassador (ep 3)
 Tonari no Seki-kun as Math Teacher (eps 11-12)
 DRAMAtical Murder as Aoba

Movies
 Dragon Ball Z: Fusion Reborn (1995) as Man (B)
 Gundam Seed: Special Edition (xxxx) as Rusty Mackenzie

OVA
 Future GPX Cyber Formula SIN (xxxx) as Phill Fritz 
 Saint Seiya: The Hades Chapter — Sanctuary (xxxx) as Papillon Myu

Video games
 Super Smash Bros. Brawl (2008) as Meta Knight 
 Yggdra Union: We'll Never Fight Alone (2008) as Durant
 Super Smash Bros. for Nintendo 3DS and Wii U (2014) as Meta Knight
Super Smash Bros. Ultimate (2018) as Meta Knight
 Kirby series as Meta Knight
 Dragon Shadow Spell as Kiriyama Laika (video game)
 Mega Man Powered Up as Oilman
 Gitaroo Man as Gregorio Siegfried Wilheim III
 DRAMAtical Murder (2012) as Aoba Seragaki
 DRAMAtical Murder Re:connect (2013) as Aoba Seragaki
 DRAMAtical Murder Re:code (2014) as Aoba Seragaki
 Dynasty Warriors 7 Empires (2011) as Xu Shu
 Dynasty Warriors 8 (2014) as Xu Shu
 Dynasty Warriors 9 Empires (2021) as Xu Shu
 Monster Retsuden Oreca Battle as Ales
 Tokimeki Memorial Girl's Side 3rd Story (2010) as Niina Junpei
 Unlight, as Blaze
 Soshite Bokura Wa, as Gray

Drama CDs
 Akanai Tobira as Tayama
 GetBackers drama CDs Sariel
 Hana-Kimi drama CDs as Izumi Sano
 Hoigakusha to Keiji no Aisho series 2: Hoigakusha to Keiji no Honne as Yuuji Ishida
 Mainichi Seiten! series 1 
 Mainichi Seiten! series 2: Kodomo wa Tomaranai 
 Oishii Karada as Daiki Nosaka
 Tsuki no Sabaku Satsujin Jiken as Akira Hayashi
 Warui Koto Shitai as Nagahisa Aikawa
 Yebisu Celebrities Grand Finale as Akira Sasao
 DRAMAtical Murder as Aoba Seragaki

Dubbing
 Batman: Brave and the Bold as (Speedy/Roy Harper)
 Teen Titans as (Speedy)
 Young Justice as (Speedy/Red Arrow/Roy Harper)

References

External links
  
  
 
 
 

1972 births
Living people
Japanese male video game actors
Japanese male voice actors
Male voice actors from Tokyo
20th-century Japanese male actors
21st-century Japanese male actors
Aoni Production voice actors